Ivan Paurević (born 1 July 1991) is a professional footballer who most recently played as a defensive midfielder for Latvian side Riga FC. He was born in Germany and has represented Croatia at under-age level.

Club career
Paurević started his professional career in his native Germany with Borussia Dortmund reserves and Fortuna Düsseldorf.

In July 2014, at the age of 23, he moved abroad, signing with Russian Premier League club Ufa. An ever-present figure in Ufa starting XI, Paurević helped them avoid relegation in his first season as the team had finished just above the relegation play-off zone.

On 7 June 2016, he rejoined his former Dortmund manager David Wagner at English Championship club Huddersfield Town, signing a three-year deal. He made his debut for the Terriers as a substitute in their 2–1 win over Brentford on 6 August 2016. Having made just two substitute appearances since joining the club, Paurevic was released by mutual consent on 10 January 2017, and joined former club Ufa's training camp in Cyprus, ahead of a potential return to the Russian club.

On 25 January 2017, he signed a new three-and-a-half-year contract with FC Ufa.

On 2 July 2019, he signed a two-year contract with German club SV Sandhausen.

International career
Paurević was born in Germany and chose to represent Croatia internationally. He played for their U-19 and U-21 teams, earning 5 caps for the latter.

Style of play
Paurević is a hard-working defensive midfielder who possesses a powerful long shot, and he can also play as a center-back. Paurević also played as a striker or attacking midfielder for FC Ufa. In 110 games he scored 11 goals. Two of these were in the Europa League

Career statistics

Club
.

Honours

Club
Borussia Dortmund II
Regionalliga West: 2011–12

References

External links
 

1991 births
Living people
Footballers from Essen
German people of Croatian descent
Association football midfielders
German footballers
Croatian footballers
Croatia youth international footballers
Croatia under-21 international footballers
Borussia Dortmund II players
Fortuna Düsseldorf players
Fortuna Düsseldorf II players
Huddersfield Town A.F.C. players
FC Ufa players
SV Sandhausen players
Riga FC players
Bundesliga players
2. Bundesliga players
3. Liga players
Regionalliga players
English Football League players
Russian Premier League players
Latvian Higher League players
Croatian expatriate footballers
Expatriate footballers in Russia
Croatian expatriate sportspeople in Russia
Expatriate footballers in England
Croatian expatriate sportspeople in England
Expatriate footballers in Latvia
Croatian expatriate sportspeople in Latvia